The National Women's Soccer League Playoffs (or NWSL Playoffs) are a single elimination tournament among six teams in the National Women's Soccer League of the United States, deciding the winner of the NWSL Championship.

Since playoff games cannot end in ties, those are broken by two straight 15-minute extra time periods, followed by shootouts of best-of-five rounds plus extra rounds as required.

Format
The top six teams in the final standings at the end of the NWSL season qualify for the playoffs and are seeded in order of their record; the top two teams receive a first-round bye. Prior to 2021, only the top four teams qualified for the playoffs.

Tiebreakers
The initial determining factor for a team's position in the standings is most points earned, with three points earned for a win, one point for a draw, and zero points for a loss. As of 2022, if at least two teams tie in point total, when determining rank and playoff qualification and seeding, the NWSL uses the following tiebreaker rules, going down the list until all teams are ranked.

 Overall goal difference
 Most total wins (Regular Season only)
 Most goals scored (Regular Season only)
 Head-to-head results (total points accumulated)
 Head-to-head most goals scored
 Least Disciplinary Points Accumulated:
 first yellow card: minus 1 point
 indirect red card (second yellow card): minus 3 points
 direct red card: minus 4 points
 yellow card and direct red card: minus 5 points
 Only one of the above point totals shall be applied to a Player in a single Game.
 Coin Flip (2 teams)/Drawing of lots (3+ teams)

NOTE: If two clubs remain tied after another club with the same number of points advances during any step, the tie breaker reverts to step 1 of the two-club format.

Playoff series history

2022 season

2021 season

2020 season

The NWSL canceled regular season and playoff in 2020 due to the coronavirus pandemic.

2019 season

2018 season

2017 season

2016 season

2015 season

2014 season

2013 season

Records and statistics

Italics indicates a defunct team.

Playoff results

Playoff records

Appearances by team

References

External links
 

Recurring sporting events established in 2013
Playoffs